Lelekovskaya is a rural locality (a village) in Ustretskoye Rural Settlement, Syamzhensky District, Vologda Oblast, Russia. The population was 38 as of 2002.

Geography 
Lelekovskaya is located 22 km northwest of Syamzha (the district's administrative centre) by road. Ust-Reka is the nearest rural locality.

References 

Rural localities in Syamzhensky District